Polvadero Gap, at an elevation of , is a gap in Fresno County, California.

The name "Polvadero" is derived from the Spanish word meaning "dusty". The gap was so named from the frequent dust storms there.

References

Mountain passes of California
Landforms of Fresno County, California